Mount Charles may refer to any of the following:

Mount Charles (Antarctica), in Enderby Land, Antarctica
Mount Charles (New Zealand), the highest point on the Otago Peninsula
Mount Charles, South Australia, the second highest peak in the Musgrave Ranges